Zulu Rock is the third album of French singer Lizzy Mercier Descloux, which was released on ZE Records in 1984 and recorded at the Satbel Studio, Johannesburg, South Africa. Its sound was inspired by African folk music mixed with 80's French pop. An alternate version of the album was entitled "Mais où Sont Passées les Gazelles" ("But Where Have The Gazelles Gone?"; "Mais où Sont Passées les Gazelles" is also the title of the third track off of the album, released as a single in 1984).

Reception

After "Mais où Sont Passées les Gazelles" became a hit single in France, Mercier Descloux' music received some public attention. Zulu Rock was highly acclaimed by press and audience; some critics even proclaimed it "album of the year".

Track listing

All songs written by Lizzy Mercier Descloux unless otherwise noted.

Personnel

Sound

The album was produced by Adam Kidron and Michel Esteban. ZE Records reissued a digital remastered album in 2006 (from analogue master tapes). It was remastered by Charlus de la Salle at South Factory Studio.

Musicians

South Africa

It was recorded in 1983 at Satbel Studio, Johannesburg, South Africa with the engineer Phil Audoire with :
Sammy Kiaas - guitar
Richard "Bugzie" Hadebe - guitar
David Mabaso - bass
Desmond Malotana - organ
Domesani - organ
Hayward (Maichala) Mahlangu - percussions
Fats Mlangeni - drums
Allian David - accordion
Javas Magubane - saxophone
Thomas Phale - saxophone
The Tiyimeleni Youngs Sisters - backing vocals
The Roadworkers - backing vocals
Peter Mottico - whistle, backing vocals
John Galanakis - music co-ordinator
Special Thanks to Peter Mottico & Julius Levine

London

And additional was recorded and mixed at Berry Street Studio, London 1984 with Brad & Brian as Engineer and Steve as Mixing Engineer (Original sound recording made by CBS 1984)
Steve Sidwell - trumpet
David Snell - harp
Henry Krein  - accordion on "Les Dents de L'Amour", "Momo in My Mind" and "Wakwazulu Kwezizulu Rock" 
Ross McFarlane - "Les Dents de L'Amour"
Ross Me Kein - backing vocals
Cassia Kidron - backing vocals

Design

All designs for the cover, booklet, and photos were made by Michel Esteban.

References

External links
ZE Records Official Website
Liner Notes Album
All Music Guide Review by Ned Raggett
Dusted Magazine Review, by Mark Griffey
ArtistDirect Review

1984 albums
Lizzy Mercier Descloux albums
albums produced by Adam Kidron
South African music